Sophus Keith Winther (June 24, 1893 – May 1983)  was a Danish-American professor and novelist.

Background
Sophus Keith Winther was born in the village of Søby, between Randers and Aarhus, Denmark, the son of Anton Winther and Sene (Lund) Winther. The family arrived in the United States on May 6, 1895 and was  naturalized in 1900. Winther attended the University of Oregon where he received his B.S. in 1918 and his M.A. in 1919. He went on to earn his Ph.D. from the University of Washington in 1927.

Career
Winther became an Instructor of English at the University of Washington during 1927. He became an assistant professor in 1930, an associate professor in 1934 and a professor in the English Department in 1940.

Winther was an author whose novels center principally on the pioneer experience  in the Great Plains. Three of his novels, Take All to Nebraska (1936), Mortgage Your Heart (1937), and This Passion Never Dies (1938), portray the struggles of the Grimsen family who arrive in rural Nebraska during the 1890s. These novels illustrate the darker side of the rural experience as fluctuating grain prices drive the family into bankruptcy.

Sophus Keith Winther was the recipient of The Western Literature Association’s 
Distinguished Achievement Award  in 1980. Letters, books, papers, clippings, pictures of Sophus Keith Winther can be found at The Danish American Archive and Library located on the campus of Dana College.  The collection includes the manuscript of an unpublished novel of the Grimsen trilogy.

Selected works
The Realistic War Novel  (1930)
Eugene O'Neill: A Critical Study (1934)
Take All to Nebraska (1936)
Mortgage Your Heart (1937)
This Passion Never Dies (1938)
Beyond the Garden Gate (1946)

References

1893 births
1983 deaths
20th-century American novelists
American male novelists
Danish emigrants to the United States
University of Washington alumni
University of Oregon alumni
20th-century American male writers